Papa Idris (born 27 July 1989) is a Nigerian footballer who plays as a central defender.

Club career
Idris started playing as a senior for Kaduna United F.C. and Kano Pillars FC. On 28 March 2013, it was announced that him and compatriot Reuben Gabriel would join Scottish Premier League side Kilmarnock as free agents, and both signed three-year deals the following week.

Idris' contract was terminated in late June 2013, without him having made one single official appearance. The move was confirmed by the club three months later, and he returned to his homeland by joining Gombe United F.C. for one year.

References

External links

1989 births
Living people
Nigerian footballers
Association football defenders
Nigeria Professional Football League players
Kaduna United F.C. players
Kano Pillars F.C. players
Gombe United F.C. players
Kilmarnock F.C. players
Nigeria international footballers
Nigerian expatriate footballers
Expatriate footballers in Scotland
Nigerian expatriate sportspeople in Scotland